Luxembourg made its Paralympic Games début at the 1976 Summer Paralympics in Toronto, with two competitors in archery and one in swimming. It competed again in 1980, where Marco Schmit won the country's first medal (a bronze in the men's 100m sprint, category E1); and in 1984, its most successful year, where Luxembourgers won a gold medal, four silver and a bronze. The country then missed the 1988 Summer Games, returning with a two-man delegation (in archery and swimming) in 1992. Luxembourg was represented by a single competitor in archery in 1996, and was absent at the 2000 and 2004 Games, returning in 2008 with a single competitor in road cycling.

Luxembourg has never taken part in the Winter Paralympics, and has won no Paralympic medal since its exceptionally good performance in 1984.

List of medallists

See also
 Luxembourg at the Olympics

References